2001: Mientras Kubrick estaba en el espacio is a 2016 Argentine road comedy-drama film written and directed by Gabriel Nicoli. The film premiered on December 8, 2016, in Argentine theaters.

Synopsis 
In 2001, far away from spaceships, Argentina suffers a social and economic crisis that arouses fury in the streets. Looting, violence and terror are part of the everyday landscape. Fear flies over the environment and families are breaking up in a rarefied climate.

Cast 
The actors participating in this film are:

 Alan Daicz as Valentin
 Malena Villa as Juliet
 Vicente Correa as Felipe
 Maria Onetto as Felipe's mother
 Gabo Correa as Felipe's father
 Jasmine Stuart as Andrea
 Roxana Randon as Grandmother
 Barbara Lombardo as Sofia
 Stephen Lamothe as Lover
 Iair Said as Video store owner
 Pablo Pinto as Man Town
 Adriana Ferrer as Valentin's mother

Production 
The movie was filmed in Azul for 5 days. The Principal photography took 4 weeks 5 days to complete.

References

External links 

 

2016 films
2016 comedy-drama films
Argentine comedy-drama films
2010s road comedy-drama films
2010s Spanish-language films
Films set in 2001
Films set in Argentina
Films shot in Argentina